Manoba tesselata is a moth in the family Nolidae. It was described by George Hampson in 1896. It is found in Taiwan, as well as on Borneo, Sumatra, Java, Bali, Seram and the north-eastern Himalayas and in Thailand. The habitat consists of montane forests.

References

Moths described in 1896
Nolinae